Architectibranchia is a clade of marine snails, gastropod molluscs.

It was originally established containing the superfamilies Acteonoidea, Ringiculoidea, and Diaphanoidea.

2005 taxonomy 
Architectibranchia was not used in the taxonomy by Bouchet & Rocroi (2005) and this taxon name has been listed as an available name.

2009 taxonomy 
Clade Architectibranchia was reinstated by Malaquias et al. in 2009; they limited the taxon to Acteonoidea and Ringiculoidea.

There are five families within the clade Architectibranchia:
 Acteonidae
 Aplustridae
 Bullinidae
 Ringiculidae
 Notodiaphanidae

2010 taxonomy 
Taxon Architectibranchia is not explicitly mentioned in the molecular analysis by Jörger et al. (2010). However, some of its members were included: Acteonoidea was moved to Lower Heterobranchia.

References 

Lower Heterobranchia